Aubette may refer to:

 Aubette (building)

French rivers:
 Aubette (Seine-Maritime)
 Aubette de Meulan
 Aubette de Magny
 Aubette (Aube)